The Unreturned is a 2010 documentary film by Nathan Fisher. The film tells the story of five middle-class Iraqi refugees caught in an absurdist purgatory of endless bureaucracy, dwindling life savings, and forced idleness. The Unreturned was shot in verité style in Syria and Jordan, with unscripted narration by the refugees in the film. These Iraqis come from diverse ethnic and religious backgrounds.

The film's world premiere was April 25, 2010 at the Minneapolis-St. Paul International Film Festival, where it was awarded "Best of Festival" honors. The film is also an official selection at the 2010 Marfa Film Festival and the 2010 Human Rights Watch International Film Festival in New York.

References

External links
 
 

2010 films
American documentary films
Documentary films about the Iraq War
2010 documentary films
Documentary films about refugees
Canadian documentary films
2010s Canadian films
2010s American films